Delfy de Ortega (21 August 1920, Turin – 21 September 1995, General Rodríguez Partido) was an Italian-born Argentine actress.

Filmography

Sin querer, queriendo (1985)
Yo también tengo fiaca (1978)
El divorcio está de moda (de común acuerdo) (1978)
Rebeldía (1975)
Hipólito y Evita (1973)
Nino (1972)
El mundo es de los jóvenes (1970)
Rebeldía (1969)
Sábado del pecado (not commercially released – 1954)
Un ángel sin pudor (1953)
El infortunado Fortunato (1952)
Paraíso robado (1952)
The Beautiful Brummel (1951)
Al Compás de tu Mentira (1950)
Diez segundos (1949)
Todo un héroe (1949)
Evasión (1947)
 Santos Vega Returns (1947)
Tres millones... y el amor (1946)
Un modelo de París (1946)
Chiruca (1945)
Santa Cándida (1945)
Madame Sans Gene (1945)
El deseo (1944)
Educating Niní (1940)
La cieguita de la avenida Alvear (1939)

References

External links

Cine Nacional

Argentine film actresses
1920 births
1995 deaths
Italian emigrants to Argentina
20th-century Italian actresses
20th-century Argentine actresses